Bialka Tatrzanska  is a village in the administrative district of Gmina Bukowina Tatrzańska, within  Tatra County, Lesser Poland Voivodeship, in southern Poland, close to the border with Slovakia.

The village has a population of 2,200.  A skiing center in the village attracts many tourists and has improved the economy of the area.  Many residents have created chalets and bed and breakfast facilities to accommodate skiers.

References

External links 

 
 Skiing in Białka Tatrzańska

Villages in Tatra County
Ski areas and resorts in Poland